Rogelio Salmona (April 28, 1929 – October 3, 2007) was a French Colombian architect. He was noted for his extensive use of red brick in his buildings and for using natural shapes like spirals, radial geometry and curves in his designs. During the latter part of his life, Salmona gained renown thanks to awards like the first prize at the 1986, 1988, and 1990 Colombian Architecture Biennials, and the Alvar Aalto Medal in 2003. His works are highly representative of Colombian architecture at the end of the twentieth century.

Early life and education
Salmona was born in Paris, but moved at an early age to Bogotá, Colombia, where he studied at the French Lyceum Louis Pasteur. Upon graduating, he enrolled in the architecture program at the National University of Colombia, then led by German and Italian architects Leopoldo Rother and Bruno Violi. During Le Corbusier's trip to Colombia in 1947, young Salmona was invited by the great architect to work with him at his atelier in Paris. In 1948, Salmona interrupted his studies in Colombia due to the Bogotazo political revolt and returned to Paris. In France, he worked as draftsman for Le Corbusier for about a decade, assisting in the design of projects like the Marseilles block, the Pilot Plan for Bogotá, Notre Dame du Haut, and Chandigarh. Later, he went on to study the sociology of art with Pierre Francastel, developing a critical vision of modern architecture.

At the end of his long apprenticeship, Salmona traveled to Spain, where he discovered Islamic architecture. The brickwork in Granada, in particular, had a lasting influence on his work. Upon returning to Colombia, Salmona graduated as architect at the Universidad de los Andes in 1962.

Career

Though Salmona traveled widely, enriching his theory of architecture, he spent the rest of his life in Colombia, where he was commissioned to design many important projects (see Public Works, and Private Buildings, below). His first major project was Torres del Parque (1964–70), comprising three residential towers and a park at the center of Bogotá. With its curves and stepped balconies, it is a complex design that many consider his masterpiece. He lived there for the rest of his life.

Other notable buildings include the National University Human Sciences Postgraduate Centre (1995–2000) and the Virgilio Barco Public Library (1999–2001), a landmark in the north of Bogotá.

During the 1980s, Salmona promoted conferences on Latin American architecture in Cali (1980) and Manizales (1987). These seminars contributed to the improvement of the exchange of information among Latin American countries, enriching the architectural dialogue throughout the region.

One of the main characteristics of his work is the conscious and careful use of water, that moves through canals and forms reflective surfaces; in fact Salmona liked to make people realize about how difficult human existence was by making all these ponds almost impossible to maintain. Other innovative use of water was the one he proposed using leaks and humidity stains: there is the popular belief (probably not true) that he used to say "one water leak for every room and one loose brick in every floor".

He died from cancer in Bogotá on October 3, 2007.

Quotes
"I am just an architect. Nothing more. Or should I say: somebody who is trying to be one. Because becoming an architect is very difficult. You never know what part of what you do has any validity. Time tells it. Good architecture will become ruins. Bad architecture disappears. But for you to know it is a ruin, you have to wait a lot of time. I hope the [Del Parque] Towers not to be ruins today but one thousand years from now".

"That thing about time being gold is a big stupidity. Time is life. I am interested in living it."

Public works

 President's House for Illustrious Guests, Cartagena (1978–1981)
 Bogotá Museum of Modern Art (MAMBO), Bogotá (1971–1988)
 Jorge Eliécer Gaitán Center, Bogotá (1980-unfinished)
 National General Archives, Bogotá  (1988–1992)
 Graduate School Building (Faculty of Human Sciences) at the National University, Bogotá
 Quimbaya Museum, Armenia (1983–1986)
 FES (Superior Studies Foundation) Headquarters, Cali (1987–1990)
 Vice Presidential House (1994–2005)
 Virgilio Barco Public Library, Bogotá (1999–2001)
 Gabriel García Márquez Cultural Center, Bogotá (2004–2008)

Private buildings

 El Polo residential complex, Bogotá (1959)
 The Headquarters of the Society of Colombian Architects, Bogotá (1961–1970)
 The Free University High School, Bogotá (1962)
 Christian Foundation housing complex, Bogotá (1963)
 Del Parque Towers, Bogotá (1964–1970)
 Alba House, Bogotá (1969, now demolished)
 Alto de Pinos complex (1975–1981)
 Various houses in the Sabana de Bogotá: Casa Puente, Suba (1976); Pasohondo, Tabio (1979); Sotará, Tenjo (1989); and three houses in Cota (1992).
 Nueva Santa Fe housing complex and community center, Bogotá (1985–1994; 1994–1997)
 The Timiza residential complex, Bogotá
 House of the Writer (owned by Gabriel García Márquez), Cartagena (1992–1995)
 Gimnasio Fontana, Guaymaral (1992–2002)
 Riofrío House, Riofrío (1997–2000)
 Alto Chicó Concrete House, Bogotá (2001–2003)
 Altazor House, Torca (2002–2004)
 Chico Norte (owned by Guillermo Gomez Botero), Bogotá, Colombia

Unfinished projects
Together with his wife and partner, María Elvira Madriñán, Salmona worked on a series of future projects, which include:

 French Cultural Center (Alliance Française), Bogotá
--> The building has been inaugurated on September the 30th of 2010.
 Valmaría Campus (National Pedagogic University), Bogotá
 University Cultural Center (University of Caldas), Manizales
--> The first phase of this building was completed in 2018.
 La Candelaria residential project, Bogotá
 New wing for the MAMBO (Modern Art Museum of Bogotá), Bogotá

Some of these buildings are currently undergoing construction.

Gallery of works

Awards
 Colombian National Architecture Prize (1986, 1988, and 1990).
 Prince Claus Award (1998)
 Architect of the Americas Award, Panamerican Federation of Architect Associations (1999)
 Professional Trajectory in Architecture Prize II, Iberoamerican Bienal of Architecture and Civil Engineering (2000)
 Alvar Aalto Medal (2003)
 Manuel Tolsá Medal, Autonomous University of México (2004)
 Honorary Fellow of The American Institute of Architects (2006)
 Orden de Boyacá (2006)
 Lápiz de Acero (2007)

Tribute
On 28 April 2021, Google celebrated his 92nd birthday with a Google Doodle.

References

External links

 Catalog of his works at Rogelio Salmona Foundation (Spanish)
Lugares dentro de lugares, La Memoria en la composición arquitectónica CCJG: Rogelio Salmona.
Article about his life (Spanish)
One of his last interviews (Spanish)
The Centro Cultural Gabriel García Márquez (Spanish)
The Gimnasio Fontana Website, with images of its facilities

Colombian architects
People from Bogotá
1929 births
2007 deaths
French emigrants to Colombia
Deaths from cancer in Colombia
Colombian people of Jewish descent
Naturalized citizens of Colombia